Roy Lipski is a British-American entrepreneur working in the energy, biosciences, technology, and consumer product industries. Lipski is most well known for being the first to develop sentiment analysis AI software, as well as the first to commercialize microchannel technology for renewable fuels, one of the first to pursue cannabinoid Biosynthesis, and the first to create an herbal mixer for cannabis that has been spun out under the name of Bud Love.

Early life and education
Lipski was born on July 26, 1971 in Tel-Aviv, Israel to Eli and Madeleine Lipski. His father was an architect and his mother an artist.

From 1984 to 1988 Lipski attended Bryanston School in South West England where he was active in rowing and photography. From 1988 to 1989 Lipski attended Winchester College in Winchester, Hampshire, where he studied mathematics, chemistry and biology.

From 1990 to 1993, Lipski attended Trinity College, Cambridge, where he received his master’s degree in natural sciences.

Career and business ventures
Lipski has been granted several patents by the United States Patent and Trademark Office, including those related to the process of operating an integrated gas-to-liquids facility, as well as relating to microchannel reactors and fabrication processes.

Goldman Sachs
Lipski began his career in 1994 at Goldman Sachs, where he started in the structured capital products group and was involved in the development and execution of structured hybrid-equity and tax-driven financial products, primarily for multinationals. He later moved to UK capital markets and advised on fixed income financings for large banks, corporations and multinationals.

Infonic
In 1996, Lipski founded Infonic, an internet research agency in Europe that helped clients measure and manage their corporate reputation online. Infonic developed Artificial intelligence software that understood sentiment in language based on algorithms developed at Cornell University for NASA. Infonic’s clients included many blue-chip companies such as Coca-Cola, P&G, Shell, Sony and others. In June 2004 Infonic was acquired by a UK-listed company.

Oxford Catalysts
In 2006 Lipski co-founded Oxford Catalysts Group (now Velocys), where he served as CEO, leading it through an IPO and subsequent acquisition of Velocys Inc., a world leader in microchannel process technology, raising over $130 million from institutional investors. Lipski took Oxford Catalysts from a 2-person company with 3 patent applications based out of the chemistry labs in the University of Oxford, through an IPO, growth, commercialization, and subsequent acquisition of Velocys in 2008.

Velocys
From 2008 to 2015 Lipski served as the CEO at Velocys, Inc, where he managed the merged Velocys/Oxford Catalysts group to a public company valued at $500 million. While there he raised over $200 million and built a shareholder base that included investors such as: Lansdowne Partners, Invesco Perpetual, Henderson Group, Neil Woodford, and Jonathan Ruffer. Today, Velocys is a leader in smaller scale, distributed Gas to liquids plants that turn biomass into liquid fuels and specialty chemicals.

Creo
In 2016 Lipski co-founded Creo, where he currently serves as CEO. Creo is a biotechnology company that produces novel cannabinoids using fermentation. Creo’s technology partner and major shareholder is San Diego-based biotechnology firm Genomatica. To date, Lipski has raised over $50 million for Creo. One of the companies' products is a cannabis mixer under the name of Bud Love.

Personal
Lipski lives in San Diego, California with his wife Friederike and their four children.

References

Alumni of Trinity College, Cambridge
Living people
American technology chief executives
American chief executives
British chief executives
1971 births